Henry D. Williams (c. 1893 in Utica, Oneida County, New York – August 7, 1934 in Utica, Oneida Co., NY) was an American lawyer and politician from New York.

Life
He graduated from Cornell University. He practiced law in Utica.

Williams was a member of the New York State Assembly (Oneida Co., 1st D.) in 1918. In June 1918, he joined the United States Marine Corps to fight in World War I.

He was a member of the New York State Senate (36th D.) from 1925 to 1930, sitting in the 148th, 149th, 150th, 151st, 152nd and 153rd New York State Legislatures.

Williams was found dead of heart disease in his law office in Utica, New York, in the morning of August 7, 1934.

References

1890s births
1934 deaths
Politicians from Utica, New York
Republican Party New York (state) state senators
Republican Party members of the New York State Assembly
Cornell University alumni
20th-century American politicians
Military personnel from Utica, New York